The United States House Financial Services Subcommittee on National Security, Illicit Finance and International Financial Institutions is a subcommittee of the House Committee on Financial Services. It was formerly part of the Subcommittee on Domestic and International Monetary Policy, Trade, and Technology until the 111th Congress, when a separate Subcommittee on Domestic Monetary Policy and Technology was created. In the 113th Congress, the two subcommittees' jurisdictions were again merged, but domestic monetary policy was again removed from its jurisdiction at the start of the 118th Congress.

Jurisdiction
The subcommittee's jurisdiction includes domestic monetary policy, and agencies which directly or indirectly affect domestic monetary policy; multilateral development institutions such as the World Bank; coins and currency, including operations of the United States Mint and the Bureau of Engraving and Printing; and international trade and finance including all matters pertaining to the International Monetary Fund and the Export-Import Bank of the United States.

Members, 117th Congress

Historical membership rosters

116th Congress

115th Congress

External links
Official Homepage

FinServ National Security
Monetary policy of the United States